|}

The Persian War Novices' Hurdle is a Grade 2 National Hunt hurdle race in Great Britain which is open to horses aged four years or older. It is run at Chepstow over a distance of about 2 miles and 3½ furlongs (2 miles 3 furlong and 100 yards, or 3,914 metres), and during its running there are ten hurdles to be jumped. The race is for novice hurdlers, and it is scheduled to take place each year in October. It is currently sponsored by Unibet and the 2022 renewal is worth £50,000 in prize money.

Replacing the Crick Hurdle, the first running took place in 1977. The event is named after Persian War, a three-time winner of the Champion Hurdle who was trained near Chepstow. It was formerly held in February, and for a period it was contested over 2 miles and 4½ furlongs. It was switched to November in the 2000–01 season, and at the same time its distance was cut by 110 yards. The race was moved to late October in 2004 and to an earlier date in October in 2015.

Winners

See also
 Horse racing in Great Britain
 List of British National Hunt races

References

 Racing Post:

 pedigreequery.com – Persian War Novices' Hurdle – Chepstow.

External links
 Race Recordings

National Hunt races in Great Britain
Chepstow Racecourse
National Hunt hurdle races